Lafayette High School (LHS) is a public four-year public high school located at 3000 W Congress Street in Lafayette, Louisiana, United States.

Athletics
Lafayette High athletics competes in the LHSAA.

Notable alumni
Armand Duplantis, World record holder, reigning Olympic and World Champion in the Track and field event Pole Vault
Paul Bako, MLB player for the Cincinnati Reds and Chicago Cubs
David Benoit, former NBA player for the Utah Jazz, the New Jersey Nets and the Orlando Magic
Ross Brupbacher, former NFL player for the Chicago Bears
Lance Cormier, former MLB player (Arizona Diamondbacks, Atlanta Braves, Baltimore Orioles, Tampa Bay Rays, Los Angeles Dodgers)
Trev Faulk, former NFL player for the St. Louis Rams
Cedric Figaro, former NFL player for the San Diego Chargers, Indianapolis Colts, Cleveland Browns, St. Louis Rams
Jerry Fontenot, former NFL player for the Chicago Bears, New Orleans Saints and Cincinnati Bengals 
Leigh Hennessy, world champion gymnast and movie stunt performer

References

External links
Official school web site
Lafayette Schools of Choice

Gifted Schools
Schools in Lafayette, Louisiana